This is a list of 576 species in the genus Chimarra, little black caddisflies.

Chimarra species

 Chimarra abacensis  g
 Chimarra aberrans Martynov, 1935 i c g
 Chimarra abyssinica Banks, 1913 i c g
 Chimarra aciculata Morse, 1974 i c g
 Chimarra acinaciformis Flint, 1998 i c g
 Chimarra actinifera Schmid, 1958 i c g
 Chimarra acula Flint, 1998 i c g
 Chimarra acuta Ross, 1959 i c g
 Chimarra adamsae Blahnik, 1998 i c g
 Chimarra adella Denning, 1952 i c g
 Chimarra adelphe Blahnik, 1998 i c g
 Chimarra adiatulla Malicky, 1993 i c g
 Chimarra adnama Malicky, 1993 i c g
 Chimarra africana Enderlein, 1929 i c g
 Chimarra aiyura Korboot, 1965 i c g
 Chimarra akana Gibbs, 1973 i c g
 Chimarra akantha Blahnik, 1997 i c g
 Chimarra akarawitta Schmid, 1958 i c g
 Chimarra akkaorum Chantaramongkol & Malicky, 1989 i c g
 Chimarra alata Bueno-Soria, 1983 i c g
 Chimarra alayoi Botosaneanu, 1980 i c g
 Chimarra albomaculata Kolbe, 1888 i c g
 Chimarra alcicorne Malicky, 1995 i c g
 Chimarra alleni Chantaramongkol & Malicky, 1989 i c g
 Chimarra alticola Banks, 1937 i c g
 Chimarra altmani Blahnik, 1998 i c g
 Chimarra amarganth Malicky, 1989 i c g
 Chimarra ambaja Mosely, 1939 i c g
 Chimarra ambulans Barnard, 1934 i c g
 Chimarra amica Blahnik & Holzenthal, 1992 i c g
 Chimarra aminadab Malicky, 1993 i c g
 Chimarra anakwoswasi Malicky, 1995 i c g
 Chimarra aneca Malicky & Chantaramongkol, 1993 i c g
 Chimarra angolensis Marlier, 1965 i c g
 Chimarra angustipennis Banks, 1903 i c g
 Chimarra anoaclana (Malicky, 1978) i c g
 Chimarra anticheira Vilarino & Calor g
 Chimarra antigua Flint, 1967 i c g
 Chimarra antilliana Flint, 1968 i c g
 Chimarra argax Malicky, 1989 i c g
 Chimarra argeia Malicky & Chantaramongkol, 1997 i c g
 Chimarra argentella Ulmer, 1906 i c g
 Chimarra argentinica Ulmer, 1909 i c g
 Chimarra ariadne Malicky, 1997 i c g
 Chimarra arima Blahnik, 1998 i c g
 Chimarra ariomana Malicky, 1993 i c g
 Chimarra armata Jacquemart, 1961 i c g
 Chimarra assamensis Kimmins, 1957 i c g
 Chimarra atara Malicky & Chantaramongkol, 1993 i c g
 Chimarra aterrima Hagen, 1861 i c g b
 Chimarra atilanoi Blahnik, 1998 i c g
 Chimarra atnia Malicky & Chantaramongkol, 1993 i c g
 Chimarra atripennis Banks, 1931 i c g
 Chimarra augusta Morse, 1971 i c g
 Chimarra aurantibasis Flint, 1998 i c g
 Chimarra aureofusca Kimmins, 1957 i c g
 Chimarra aureopunctata Flint, 1967 i c g
 Chimarra auriceps Hagen, 1858 i c g
 Chimarra auricoma Kimmins, 1957 i c g
 Chimarra auripilis Navas, 1933 i c g
 Chimarra aurivittata Flint, 1971 i c g
 Chimarra auronitens Ulmer, 1906 i c g
 Chimarra australica Ulmer, 1916 i c g
 Chimarra australis Navas, 1923 i c g
 Chimarra aviceps Flint, 1998 i c g
 Chimarra babarensis  g
 Chimarra babuyana Mey, 1998 i c g
 Chimarra bacillorum Mey, 1990 i c g
 Chimarra baculifera Marlier, 1965 i c g
 Chimarra banksi (Ulmer, 1907) i c g
 Chimarra barinita Flint, 1998 i c g
 Chimarra barrettae (Banks, 1900) i c g
 Chimarra batukaua Malicky, 1995 i c g
 Chimarra beameri Denning, 1950 i c g
 Chimarra beckeri Flint, 1998 i c g
 Chimarra belizensis Blahnik, 1998 i c g
 Chimarra berenike Malicky, 1998 i c g
 Chimarra berghei Marlier, 1951 i c g
 Chimarra bertrandi Scott, 1974 i c g
 Chimarra bettinae Marlier & Marlier, 1982 i c g
 Chimarra beylaensis Gibon, 1986 i c g
 Chimarra biatec Malicky, 1993 i c g
 Chimarra bicolor (Banks, 1901) i c g
 Chimarra bicoloroides Flint, 1967 i c g
 Chimarra bidens Ulmer, 1909 i c g
 Chimarra bidentata Blahnik, 1998 i c g
 Chimarra bimbltona Malicky, 1979 i c g
 Chimarra biramosa Kimmins, 1957 i c g
 Chimarra bisectilis Flint, 1998 i c g
 Chimarra bispinosa Gibbs, 1973 i c g
 Chimarra biungulata Kimmins, 1964 i c g
 Chimarra blepharophera Flint, 1998 i c g
 Chimarra boraceia Flint, 1998 i c g
 Chimarra braconoides (Walker, 1860) i c g
 Chimarra brasiliana Ulmer, 1905 i c g
 Chimarra braueri  g
 Chimarra briseis Malicky, 1998 i c g
 Chimarra burmana Kimmins, 1957 i c g
 Chimarra burmeisteri Flint, 1998 i c g
 Chimarra butleri Denning, 1962 i c g
 Chimarra cachina Mosely, 1942 i c g
 Chimarra cakaudrovensis  g
 Chimarra calawiti Mey, 1995 i c g
 Chimarra callasae Gibon, 1982 i c g
 Chimarra calundoensis Marlier, 1965 i c g
 Chimarra camella Blahnik, 1997 i c g
 Chimarra camerunensis Marlier, 1980 i c g
 Chimarra camposae Flint, 1998 i c g
 Chimarra camura Blahnik, 1997 i c g
 Chimarra canoaba Flint, 1998 i c g
 Chimarra cara Mosely, 1936 i c g
 Chimarra caribea Flint, 1968 i c g
 Chimarra carolae Flint, 1998 i c g
 Chimarra cartwrighti  g
 Chimarra cascada Blahnik, 1998 i c g
 Chimarra centralis Ross, 1959 i c g
 Chimarra centrispina Flint, 1998 i c g
 Chimarra cereris Barnard, 1934 i c g
 Chimarra ceylanica Kimmins, 1957 i c g
 Chimarra cheesmanae Kimmins, 1962 i c g
 Chimarra chela Blahnik, 1997 i c g
 Chimarra chiangmaiensis Chantaramongkol & Malicky, 1989 i c g
 Chimarra chicapa Marlier, 1965 i c g
 Chimarra chocoensis Blahnik, 1998 i c g
 Chimarra chrysosoma Flint, 1998 i c g
 Chimarra cipoensis Flint, 1998 i c g
 Chimarra circularis Hagen, 1859 i c g
 Chimarra cirrifera Flint, 1998 i c g
 Chimarra clara Mosely, 1939 i c g
 Chimarra claviloba Flint, 1974 i c g
 Chimarra cognata Kimmins, 1957 i c g
 Chimarra coheni Blahnik, 1998 i c g
 Chimarra colmillo Blahnik & Holzenthal, 1992 i c g
 Chimarra coma Malicky & Chantaramongkol, 1993 i c g
 Chimarra concava Kimmins, 1957 i c g
 Chimarra concolor Ulmer, 1905 i c g
 Chimarra confusa Ulmer, 1907 i c g
 Chimarra congestla Malicky, 1993 i c g
 Chimarra conica Flint, 1983 i c g
 Chimarra consimilis Martynov, 1912 i c g
 Chimarra cornuta Ross, 1959 i c g
 Chimarra costaricensis Flint, 1998 i c g
 Chimarra creagra Flint, 1981 i c g
 Chimarra crena Bueno-Soria, 1983 i c g
 Chimarra crenobia Mey, 1995 i c g
 Chimarra crepidata Kimmins, 1957 i c g
 Chimarra cressae Blahnik, 1998 i c g
 Chimarra crinobia Mey, 1995 i c g
 Chimarra crocifera Morse, 1974 i c g
 Chimarra cubanorum Botosaneanu, 1980 i c g
 Chimarra cultellata Flint, 1983 i c g
 Chimarra cumata Malicky & Chantaramongkol, 1993 i c g
 Chimarra curfmani Ross, 1959 i c g
 Chimarra cyclopica Kimmins, 1962 i c g
 Chimarra danaokana Mey, 1998 i c g
 Chimarra decimlobata Flint, 1991 i c g
 Chimarra deksamensis Malicky, 1999 i c g
 Chimarra demeter Malicky, 2000 i c g
 Chimarra dentosa Ross, 1948 i c g
 Chimarra devoensis  g
 Chimarra devva Malicky & Chantaramongkol, 1993 i c g
 Chimarra diakis Flint, 1971 i c g
 Chimarra diannae Flint & Sykora, 1993 i c g
 Chimarra didyma Flint, 1998 i c g
 Chimarra digitata Martynov, 1935 i c g
 Chimarra dioni Gibon, 1986 i c g
 Chimarra dirke Malicky & Thamsenanupap in Malicky, 2000 i c g
 Chimarra discolor Kimmins, 1957 i c g
 Chimarra distermina Flint, 1998 i c g
 Chimarra divergena Gibbs, 1973 i c g
 Chimarra dolabrifera Flint & Reyes-Arrunategui, 1991 i c g
 Chimarra dominicana Flint, 1968 i c g
 Chimarra donamariae Denning & Sykora, 1968 i c g
 Chimarra duckworthi Flint, 1967 i c g
 Chimarra dudosa Blahnik, 1998 i c g
 Chimarra dulitensis Kimmins, 1955 i c g
 Chimarra dybowskina Navás, 1931 i c g
 Chimarra eccaio Malicky, 1993 i c g
 Chimarra elga Mosely, 1939 i c g
 Chimarra elia Ross, 1944 i c g
 Chimarra elviomar Malicky, 1993 i c g
 Chimarra embia Ross, 1959 i c g
 Chimarra emima Ross, 1959 i c g
 Chimarra ensifera Flint, 1998 i c g
 Chimarra erectiloba Flint, 1998 i c g
 Chimarra espinosa Blahnik, 1998 i c g
 Chimarra evoluta Kimmins, 1957 i c g
 Chimarra exapia Malicky & Chantaramongkol, 1993 i c g
 Chimarra excavata Kimmins, 1957 i c g
 Chimarra falcata Kimmins, 1962 i c g
 Chimarra falcifera Jacquemart, 1966 i c g
 Chimarra falculata Lago & Harris, 1987 i c g
 Chimarra fallax (Ulmer, 1912) i c g
 Chimarra fansipangensis Mey, 1998 i c g
 Chimarra fenestrata Kimmins, 1964 i c g
 Chimarra feria Ross, 1941 i c g
 Chimarra fernandezi Flint, 1981 i c g
 Chimarra feuerborni Ulmer, 1951 i c g
 Chimarra fijiana  g
 Chimarra fimbriata Flint, 1974 i c g
 Chimarra fittkaui Flint, 1971 i c g
 Chimarra flaviventris Kimmins, 1957 i c g
 Chimarra flinti Bueno-Soria, 1985 i c g
 Chimarra florida Ross, 1944 i c g
 Chimarra foliata Kimmins, 1959 i c g
 Chimarra forcipata Blahnik, 1997 i c g
 Chimarra formosana Ulmer, 1915 i c g
 Chimarra froehlichi Flint, 1998 i c g
 Chimarra fulmeki Ulmer, 1951 i c g
 Chimarra furcata Jacquemart, 1961 i c g
 Chimarra furti Mey, 1998 i c g
 Chimarra fusca Kimmins, 1957 i c g
 Chimarra fuscipes Kimmins, 1958 i c g
 Chimarra garciai Botosaneanu, 1980 i c g
 Chimarra gemmal Malicky, 1989 i c g
 Chimarra georgensis Barnard, 1934 i c g
 Chimarra geranoides Flint, 1998 i c g
 Chimarra gibba Blahnik, 1998 i c g
 Chimarra gigama Malicky, 1989 i c g
 Chimarra gilvimacula Flint, 1998 i c g
 Chimarra godagama Schmid, 1958 i c g
 Chimarra gondela Flint, 1974 i c g
 Chimarra goroca Sykora, 1967 i c g
 Chimarra gressitti Sykora, 1967 i c g
 Chimarra guanacasteca Blahnik & Holzenthal, 1992 i c g
 Chimarra guapa Botosaneanu, 1977 i c g
 Chimarra guatemalensis Blahnik, 1998 i c g
 Chimarra gunungkawi Malicky, 1995 i c g
 Chimarra guyanensis Flint, 1998 i c g
 Chimarra haesitationis Botosaneanu, 1994 i c g
 Chimarra haimuoi Malicky, 1995 i c g
 Chimarra haimuoiba Malicky, 1995 i c g
 Chimarra haimuoibon Malicky, 1995 i c
 Chimarra haimuoihai Malicky, 1995 i c g
 Chimarra haimuoimot Malicky, 1995 i c g
 Chimarra haimuoinam Malicky, 1995 i c g
 Chimarra hairouna Botosaneanu, 1990 i c g
 Chimarra hamularis Sun, 1997 i c g
 Chimarra heliaca Mey, 1998 i c g
 Chimarra heligma Blahnik, 1997 i c g
 Chimarra helomyzida  g
 Chimarra henryi Kimmins, 1957 i c g
 Chimarra heppneri Blahnik, 1997 i c g
 Chimarra hezron Malicky, 1993 i c g
 Chimarra hienghene Malicky, 1981 i c g
 Chimarra holzenthali Lago & Harris, 1987 i c g
 Chimarra hoogstraali Ross, 1956 i c g
 Chimarra horok Malicky, 1989 i c g
 Chimarra houvichka Schmid, 1960 i c g
 Chimarra htinorum Chantaramongkol & Malicky, 1989 i c g
 Chimarra hyoeides Flint, 1983 i c g
 Chimarra immaculata Ulmer, 1911 i c g
 Chimarra indigota Mosely, 1941 i c g
 Chimarra inflata Blahnik, 1998 i c g
 Chimarra ino Marlier, 1981 i c g
 Chimarra intermedia Jacquemart, 1961 i c g
 Chimarra intexta Mosely, 1931 i c g
 Chimarra inthanonensis Chantaramongkol & Malicky, 1989 i c g
 Chimarra irwini Flint, 1998 i c g
 Chimarra izabala Blahnik, 1998 i c g
 Chimarra jacobsoni Ulmer, 1951 i c g
 Chimarra jamaicensis Flint, 1968 i c g
 Chimarra janzeni Blahnik & Holzenthal, 1992 i c g
 Chimarra jaroschi Malicky, 1994 i c g
 Chimarra jemima Blahnik & Holzenthal, 1992 i c g
 Chimarra jiraprapa Chantaramongkol & Malicky, 1986 i c g
 Chimarra jisipu Malicky, 1989 i c g
 Chimarra joliveti Jacquemart, 1979 i c g
 Chimarra jugescens Flint, 1998 i c g
 Chimarra juliae Flint, 1998 i c g
 Chimarra kabashana (Marlier, 1943) i c g
 Chimarra kadavuensis  g
 Chimarra kailishchandrai Malicky, 1997 i c g
 Chimarra karenorum Chantaramongkol & Malicky, 1989 i c g
 Chimarra karoyanitensis  g
 Chimarra kenyana Ulmer, 1931 i c g
 Chimarra khamuorum Chantaramongkol & Malicky, 1989 i c g
 Chimarra khasia Kimmins, 1957 i c g
 Chimarra kimminsi  g
 Chimarra koki Botosaneanu, 1996 i c g
 Chimarra kokodana Kimmins, 1962 i c g
 Chimarra kontilos Blahnik, 1997 i c g
 Chimarra koualeensis Joahnson & Mary, 2009 g
 Chimarra krugeri Jacquemart, 1963 i c g
 Chimarra kuala Olah, 1993 i c g
 Chimarra kumaonensis Martynov, 1935 i c g
 Chimarra kwansiensis Hwang, 1957 i c g
 Chimarra lacroixi Navas, 1921 i c g
 Chimarra laguna Ross, 1951 i c g
 Chimarra lahuorum Chantaramongkol & Malicky, 1989 i c g
 Chimarra lakhwinderae  g
 Chimarra langleyae Blahnik, 1998 i c g
 Chimarra lankana Kimmins, 1957 i c g
 Chimarra lannaensis Chantaramongkol & Malicky, 1989 i c g
 Chimarra lata Blahnik & Holzenthal, 1992 i c g
 Chimarra lavensis  g
 Chimarra lavuaorum Chantaramongkol & Malicky, 1989 i c g
 Chimarra lejea Mosely, 1948 i c g
 Chimarra leopoldi Jacquemart, 1981 i c g
 Chimarra leta Mosely, 1936 i c g
 Chimarra leucophlebia Navás, 1932 i c g
 Chimarra levuensis  g
 Chimarra lewisi Kimmins, 1957 i c g
 Chimarra lichiuensis Hsu & Chen, 1996 i c g
 Chimarra limon Blahnik, 1998 i c g
 Chimarra lissuorum Chantaramongkol & Malicky, 1989 i c g
 Chimarra litugena Malicky & Chantaramongkol, 1993 i c g
 Chimarra litussa Malicky & Chantaramongkol, 1993 i c g
 Chimarra lobata Flint, 1967 i c g
 Chimarra lojaensis Flint, 1998 i c g
 Chimarra longistylis Jacquemart & Statzner, 1981 i c g
 Chimarra longiterga Blahnik & Holzenthal, 1992 i c g
 Chimarra lorengau Malicky, 1994 i c g
 Chimarra loriana Navas, 1933 i c g
 Chimarra lotta Malicky, 1993 i c g
 Chimarra lufirae Jacquemart, 1961 i c g
 Chimarra lukawaei Jacquemart, 1961 i c g
 Chimarra lupialae Jacquemart, 1961 i c g
 Chimarra luzonica Banks, 1913 i c g
 Chimarra lwirona Statzner, 1976 i c g
 Chimarra macara Flint, 1998 i c g
 Chimarra machadoi  g
 Chimarra machaerophora Flint, 1968 i c g
 Chimarra macuatensis  g
 Chimarra majuscula Blahnik, 1997 i c g
 Chimarra malaisei Kimmins, 1957 i c g
 Chimarra maldonadoi Flint, 1964 i c g
 Chimarra malickyi  g
 Chimarra manni Banks, 1924 i c g
 Chimarra margaritae Flint, 1991 i c g
 Chimarra marginata (Linnaeus, 1767) i c g
 Chimarra maritza Flint, 1998 i c g
 Chimarra massana Malicky, 1994 i c g
 Chimarra matura Malicky & Chantaramongkol, 1993 i c g
 Chimarra mauritania Jacquemart, 1960 i c g
 Chimarra mawsmaiensis  g
 Chimarra mayottensis Joahnson & Mary, 2009 g
 Chimarra medioloba Flint, 1971 i c g
 Chimarra meorum Chantaramongkol & Malicky, 1989 i c g
 Chimarra merengue Blahnik, 1997 i c g
 Chimarra mesodonta Vilarino & Calor g
 Chimarra mexicana (Banks, 1900) i c g
 Chimarra minca Flint, 1998 i c g
 Chimarra mindanensis Mey, 1998 i c g
 Chimarra minga Flint, 1998 i c g
 Chimarra minima Ulmer, 1907 i c g
 Chimarra minuta Martynov, 1935 i c g
 Chimarra mitis (Hagen, 1858) i c g
 Chimarra mlabriorum Chantaramongkol & Malicky, 1989 i c g
 Chimarra moesta Banks, 1924 i c g
 Chimarra momma Malicky & Chantaramongkol, 1993 i c g
 Chimarra mommaides Mey, 1998 i c g
 Chimarra mongelutonga Malicky, 1979 i c g
 Chimarra monorum Chantaramongkol & Malicky, 1989 i c g
 Chimarra montana Kimmins, 1955 i c g
 Chimarra monticola Kimmins in Mosely & Kimmins, 1953 i c g
 Chimarra morio Burmeister, 1839 i c g
 Chimarra moselyi Denning, 1948 i c g
 Chimarra munozi Blahnik & Holzenthal, 1992 i c g
 Chimarra muoibay Malicky, 1995 i c g
 Chimarra muoichin Malicky, 1995 i c g
 Chimarra muoitam Malicky, 1995 i c g
 Chimarra mushuvae Marlier, 1951 i c g
 Chimarra mussaua Malicky, 1994 i c g
 Chimarra mycterophora Flint, 1998 i c g
 Chimarra nahesson Malicky & Chantaramongkol, 1993 i c g
 Chimarra naitasirensis  g
 Chimarra nakkiensis  g
 Chimarra nasuta Flint, 1998 i c g
 Chimarra nathani  g
 Chimarra neblina Blahnik, 1997 i c g
 Chimarra nemet Malicky, 1993 i c g
 Chimarra neofimbriata Flint, 1974 i c g
 Chimarra nepalensis Kimmins, 1964 i c g
 Chimarra nervosa (Brauer, 1867) i c g
 Chimarra nigra Kimmins, 1964 i c g
 Chimarra nigrella Mey, 1995 i c g
 Chimarra nigrorosea Schmid, 1960 i c g
 Chimarra noebia Malicky & Chantaramongkol, 1993 i c g
 Chimarra nonna Malicky, 1993 i c g
 Chimarra oaxaca Blahnik, 1998 i c g
 Chimarra obscura (Walker, 1852) i c g b
 Chimarra obscurella Banks, 1924 i c g
 Chimarra okuihorum Mey, 1998 i c g
 Chimarra onima Flint, 1991 i c g
 Chimarra opaca Mey, 1998 i c g
 Chimarra ophiognatha Mey, 1998 i c g
 Chimarra ortiziana Flint, 1967 i c g
 Chimarra otuzcoensis Flint & Reyes-Arrunategui, 1991 i c g
 Chimarra ovalis Ross, 1959 i c g
 Chimarra pablito Flint, 1998 i c g
 Chimarra palawana Malicky, 1994 i c g
 Chimarra papuana Kimmins, 1962 i c g
 Chimarra paracreagra Blahnik, 1998 i c g
 Chimarra parana Flint, 1972 i c g
 Chimarra paraortiziana Blahnik & Holzenthal, 1992 i c g
 Chimarra parasocia Lago & Harris, 1987 i c g
 Chimarra paria Flint, 1998 i c g
 Chimarra pataplan Malicky, 1989 i c g
 Chimarra patosa Ross, 1956 i c g
 Chimarra pedalis Banks, 1931 i c g
 Chimarra peineta Blahnik & Holzenthal, 1992 i c g
 Chimarra pelaezi Bueno-Soria, 1985 i c g
 Chimarra persimilis Banks, 1920 i c g
 Chimarra peruviana Flint, 1998 i c g
 Chimarra petersorum Flint, 1998 i c g
 Chimarra petri Gibbs, 1973 i c g
 Chimarra petricola Flint, 1998 i c g
 Chimarra peytoni Flint, 1998 i c g
 Chimarra philipponi Gibon, 1986 i c g
 Chimarra picea Navas, 1924 i c g
 Chimarra piliferosa Flint, 1998 i c g
 Chimarra pilosella Navás, 1932 i c g
 Chimarra pipake Malicky & Chantaramongkol, 1993 i c g
 Chimarra piraya Flint, 1983 i c g
 Chimarra platyrhina Flint, 1981 i c g
 Chimarra plaumanni Flint, 1983 i c g
 Chimarra pollex Blahnik & Holzenthal, 1992 i c g
 Chimarra pondoensis Barnard, 1941 i c g
 Chimarra poolei Flint, 1981 i c g
 Chimarra potamophila Mey, 1995 i c g
 Chimarra potosi Blahnik, 1998 i c g
 Chimarra primula Denning, 1950 i c g
 Chimarra prisna Chantaramongkol & Malicky, 1986 i c g
 Chimarra prodhoni Gibon, 1985 i c g
 Chimarra prolata Blahnik, 1997 i c g
 Chimarra protuberans Blahnik, 1998 i c g
 Chimarra psychodida  g
 Chimarra puertoricensis Flint, 1964 i c g
 Chimarra pulchra Hagen, 1861 i c g
 Chimarra pulla Navás, 1932 i c g
 Chimarra pumila Banks, 1920 i c g
 Chimarra purisca Flint, 1998 i c g
 Chimarra pusilla Blahnik, 1997 i c g
 Chimarra puya Flint, 1998 i c g
 Chimarra pylaea Denning, 1941 i c g
 Chimarra quadratiterga Blahnik, 1998 i c g
 Chimarra quadrifurcata Botosaneanu, 1994 i c g
 Chimarra quadrispinosa Jacquemart & Statzner, 1981 i c g
 Chimarra quaternaria Flint, 1971 i c g
 Chimarra quina Flint, 1998 i c g
 Chimarra quitacalzon Blahnik, 1998 i c g
 Chimarra rafita Blahnik, 1998 i c g
 Chimarra ram Malicky, 1993 i c g
 Chimarra rama Malicky & Chantaramongkol, 1993 i c g
 Chimarra ramakien Malicky & Chantaramongkol, 1993 i c g
 Chimarra ravanna Malicky & Chantaramongkol, 1993 i c g
 Chimarra recta Ulmer, 1930 i c g
 Chimarra retrorsa Flint, 1974 i c g
 Chimarra rhamphodes Blahnik, 1998 i c g
 Chimarra rhodesi Kimmins, 1957 i c g
 Chimarra ridleyi Denning, 1941 i c g
 Chimarra rifati  g
 Chimarra robynsi (Jacquemart, 1967) i c g
 Chimarra rongliensis  g
 Chimarra rosalesi Flint, 1981 i c g
 Chimarra rosavensis  g
 Chimarra rossi Bueno-Soria, 1985 i c g
 Chimarra ruficeps Ulmer, 1913 i c g
 Chimarra sabrona Kimmins, 1962 i c g
 Chimarra sadayu Malicky, 1993 i c g
 Chimarra saganeitina Navás, 1932 i c g
 Chimarra sandhamma Schmid, 1958 i c g
 Chimarra sarophora Flint, 1998 i c g
 Chimarra sassandrae Gibon, 1982 i c g
 Chimarra saudia Malicky, 1986 i c g
 Chimarra schiza Ross, 1959 i c g
 Chimarra schlingeri  g
 Chimarra schmidi Kimmins, 1962 i c g
 Chimarra schwendingeri Chantaramongkol & Malicky, 1989 i c g
 Chimarra scopula Flint, 1974 i c g
 Chimarra scopulifera Kimmins, 1957 i c g
 Chimarra scopuloides Flint, 1974 i c g
 Chimarra securigera Flint, 1998 i c g
 Chimarra sedlaceki Sykora, 1967 i c g
 Chimarra segmentipennis (Hwang, 1957) i c g
 Chimarra sensillata Flint, 1981 i c g
 Chimarra septemlobata Flint, 1991 i c g
 Chimarra septifera Flint, 1974 i c g
 Chimarra sepulchralis Hagen, 1858 i c g
 Chimarra setosa Ross, 1959 i c g
 Chimarra shanorum Chantaramongkol & Malicky, 1989 i c g
 Chimarra shaowuensis Hwang, 1957 i c g
 Chimarra shiva Malicky & Chantaramongkol, 1993 i c g
 Chimarra siami Jacquemart, 1979 i c g
 Chimarra signata Banks, 1936 i c g
 Chimarra sikkimensis  g
 Chimarra simpliciforma Flint, 1971 i c g
 Chimarra sinuata Hwang, 1957 i c g
 Chimarra sinuosa Kimmins, 1962 i c g
 Chimarra sita Malicky & Chantaramongkol, 1993 i c g
 Chimarra skaidan Malicky, 1989 i c g
 Chimarra skiborskii Mey, 1995 i c g
 Chimarra socia Hagen, 1861 i c g
 Chimarra solisi Blahnik & Holzenthal, 1992 i c g
 Chimarra soloi  g
 Chimarra somereni Marlier, 1951 i c g
 Chimarra spangleri Bueno-Soria, 1985 i c g
 Chimarra spatulata Ross, 1959 i c g
 Chimarra spinifera Kimmins, 1957 i c g
 Chimarra spinulifera Flint, 1968 i c g
 Chimarra spitzeri Malicky, 1994 i c g
 Chimarra straminea Flint, 1998 i c g
 Chimarra strongyla Blahnik, 1998 i c g
 Chimarra suadulla Malicky & Chantaramongkol, 1993 i c g
 Chimarra supanna Malicky, 1993 i c g
 Chimarra suryasena Schmid, 1960 i c g
 Chimarra suthepensis Chantaramongkol & Malicky, 1989 i c g
 Chimarra sylvestris Gibon, 1985 i c g
 Chimarra sythoffi Ulmer, 1951 i c g
 Chimarra szunyoghyi Olah, 1986 i c g
 Chimarra tagalica Banks, 1937 i c g
 Chimarra tamba Flint, 1998 i c g
 Chimarra tamsi Mosely, 1936 i c g
 Chimarra tapanti Blahnik, 1998 i c g
 Chimarra tawitawi Malicky, 1994 i c g
 Chimarra telihigola Schmid, 1958 i c g
 Chimarra teresae Flint, 1998 i c g
 Chimarra texana Banks, 1920 i c g b
 Chimarra thaiorum Chantaramongkol & Malicky, 1989 i c g
 Chimarra thienemanni Ulmer, 1951 i c g
 Chimarra tibialis (Navas, 1922) i c g
 Chimarra tipulida  g
 Chimarra toga Malicky & Chantaramongkol, 1993 i c g
 Chimarra togoana (Ulmer, 1907) i c g
 Chimarra tokotaai  g
 Chimarra tortuosa Blahnik, 1997 i c g
 Chimarra toubaensis Gibon, 1985 i c g
 Chimarra travei Jacquemart, 1963 i c g
 Chimarra triangularis Kimmins, 1963 i c g
 Chimarra triangulata Hsu & Chen, 1996 i c g
 Chimarra trispina Jacquemart, 1961 i c g
 Chimarra truncatiloba Flint, 1974 i c g
 Chimarra tsudai Ross, 1956 i c g
 Chimarra tucuna Flint, 1998 i c g
 Chimarra uara Flint, 1971 i c g
 Chimarra ulmeri Kimmins, 1962 i c g
 Chimarra uncata Morse, 1974 i c g
 Chimarra uncula Mey, 1998 i c g
 Chimarra upia Malicky, 1993 i c g
 Chimarra uppita Malicky & Chantaramongkol, 1993 i c g
 Chimarra uranka Mosely in Mosely & Kimmins, 1953 i c g
 Chimarra uschtu Malicky, 1989 i c g
 Chimarra usitatissima Flint, 1971 i c g
 Chimarra utahensis Ross, 1938 i c g
 Chimarra utra Blahnik, 1998 i c g
 Chimarra uvana Kimmins, 1957 i c g
 Chimarra uvirana Marlier, 1951 i c g
 Chimarra valoma Malicky, 1994 i c g
 Chimarra vanuensis  g
 Chimarra vasoudeva Schmid, 1960 i c g
 Chimarra veisarensis  g
 Chimarra ventrospina  g
 Chimarra vibena Malicky & Chantaramongkol, 1993 i c g
 Chimarra villalobosi Bueno-Soria, 1985 i c g
 Chimarra virgencita Blahnik & Holzenthal, 1992 i c g
 Chimarra vitiensis  g
 Chimarra vuda  g
 Chimarra waensis Gibon, 1985 i c g
 Chimarra wiharawela Schmid, 1958 i c g
 Chimarra wilcuma Blahnik, 1998 i c g
 Chimarra wilsoni Flint, 1967 i c g
 Chimarra woldai Blahnik, 1998 i c g
 Chimarra wushikangensis Hsu & Chen, 1996 i c g
 Chimarra xenillion Neboiss, 1986 i c g
 Chimarra xingu Blahnik, 1997 i c g
 Chimarra xus Blahnik, 1998 i c g
 Chimarra yaloma Malicky, 1994 i c g
 Chimarra yanura Blahnik & Holzenthal, 1992 i c g
 Chimarra yaorum Chantaramongkol & Malicky, 1989 i c g
 Chimarra yaoshanensis Hwang, 1957 i c g
 Chimarra ypsilon Flint, 1983 i c g
 Chimarra yskal Malicky, 1989 i c g
 Chimarra zagroensis Chvojka, 1996 i c g
 Chimarra zamora Blahnik, 1998 i c g
 Chimarra zoria Mosely, 1939 i c g

Data sources: i = ITIS, c = Catalogue of Life, g = GBIF, b = Bugguide.net

References

Chimarra
Articles created by Qbugbot